Events in the history of Munich in Germany.

Origin

The year 1158 is assumed to be the foundation date of Munich, which is only the earliest date the city is mentioned in a document. By that time the Guelph Henry the Lion, Duke of Saxony and Bavaria, built a bridge over the river Isar next to a settlement of Benedictine monks.

The monks' presence dated back to the 8th century, although settlement in the Munich area can be traced back to the late neolithic.

To force traders to use his bridge (and charge them for doing so) Henry also destroyed a nearby bridge owned by bishop Otto von Freising (Freising). Subsequently, the bishop and Henry quarreled about the city before Emperor Frederick I Barbarossa at an Imperial Diet held in Augsburg in 1158. This sanctioned Henry's spoliation, and awarded an annual compensation for the bishop, and also confirmed Munich's trading and currency rights.

Middle Ages

Almost two decades later in 1175 Munich was officially granted city status and received fortification. In 1180, with the trial of Henry the Lion, Otto I Wittelsbach became Duke of Bavaria and Munich was handed over to the bishop of Freising. Otto's heirs, the Wittelsbach dynasty would rule Bavaria until 1918. In 1240 Munich itself was transferred to Otto II Wittelsbach and in 1255, when the dukedom of Bavaria was split in two, Munich became the ducal residence of Upper Bavaria.

Duke Louis IV was elected German king in 1314 and crowned as Holy Roman Emperor in 1328. He strengthened the city's  position by granting it the salt monopoly, thus assuring it of additional income. After outmaneuvering Freising, Munich was the principal river crossing on the route from Salzburg to Augsburg. Salzburg (vicinity) was the source of salt, and Augsburg was, at the time, a much more important city than Munich.

In 1327 most of the city was destroyed by a fire but was rebuilt, extended and protected with a new fortification some years later. Philosophers like Michael of Cesena, Marsilius of Padua and William of Ockham supported Louis IV in his fight with the papacy and were protected at the emperor's court. After the citizenry revolted several times against the dukes, a new castle was built close to the fortification, starting in 1385. An uprising of the guilds in 1397 was suppressed in 1403.

Another devastating fire destroyed parts of the city in 1429. Since the town fathers considered themselves threatened by the Hussites, the fortification was extended. In the late 15th century Munich underwent a revival of gothic arts—the Old Town Hall was enlarged, and a new cathedral—the Frauenkirche—constructed within only twenty years, starting in 1468. The cathedral has become a symbol for the city with its two brick towers and onion domes.

Capital of the reunited duchy of Bavaria

When Bavaria was reunited in 1506 Munich became capital of the whole of Bavaria. The arts and politics became increasingly influenced by the court. During the 16th century Munich was a center of the German counter reformation, and also of renaissance arts. Duke Wilhelm V commissioned the Jesuit Michaelskirche, which became a center for the counter-reformation, and also built the Hofbräuhaus for brewing brown beer in 1589.

The Catholic League was founded in Munich in 1609.
In 1623 during the Thirty Years' War Munich became electoral residence when Maximilian I, Duke of Bavaria was invested with the electoral dignity but in 1632 the city was occupied by Gustav II Adolph of Sweden. When the bubonic plague broke out in 1634 and 1635 about one third of the population died.

After the war Munich quickly became a center of baroque life. Elector Ferdinand Maria's consort Henriette Adelaide of Savoy invited numerous Italian architects and artists to the city, and built the Theatinerkirche and Nymphenburg palace on the occasion of the birth of their son and heir Maximilian II Emanuel, elector of Bavaria.

Munich was under the control of the Habsburg family for some years after Maximilian II Emanuel had made a pact with France in 1705 during the War of the Spanish Succession. The occupation led to bloody uprisings against the Austrian imperial troops followed by a massacre while farmers were rioting (the "Sendlinger Mordweihnacht" or Sendling's Night of Murder). The coronation of Max Emanuel's son elector Charles Albert as Emperor Charles VII in 1742 led to another Habsburg occupation. For a short time 1744-1745 Munich was the imperial residence again under Charles VII. The city's first academic institution, the Bavarian Academy of Sciences, was founded in 1759 by Maximilian III Joseph, who abandoned his forefather's imperial ambitions and made peace. From 1789 onwards, when the old medieval fortification was demolished, the English Garden was laid out—it is one of the world's largest urban public parks. By that time, the city was growing very quickly and was one of the largest cities in continental Europe.

Capital of the Kingdom of Bavaria

In 1806, it became the capital of the new Kingdom of Bavaria, with the state's parliament (the Landtag) and the new archdiocese of Munich and Freising being located in the city. Twenty years later Landshut University was moved to Munich.

Many of the city's finest buildings belong to this period and were built under the reign of King Ludwig I. These neoclassical buildings include the Ruhmeshalle with the Bavaria statue by Ludwig Michael von Schwanthaler and those on the magnificent Ludwigstraße and the Königsplatz, built by the architects Leo von Klenze and Friedrich von Gärtner. Under King Max II the Maximilianstraße was constructed in Perpendicular style.

The railways reached Munich in 1839, followed by trams in 1876 and electric lighting in 1882. The Technical University of Munich was founded in 1868. The city hosted Germany's first exhibition of electricity, and in 1930 the first ever television was showcased at the city's Deutsches Museum (founded in 1903) on the banks of the Isar. Numerous inventors and scientists worked in Munich, including Alois Senefelder, Joseph von Fraunhofer, Justus von Liebig, Georg Ohm, Carl von Linde, Rudolf Diesel, Wilhelm Conrad Röntgen, Emil Kraepelin and Alois Alzheimer, and the young Albert Einstein attended the Luitpold Gymnasium. In 1911 the Hellabrunn Zoo opened in the city.

Munich also became a center of the arts and literature again, as Thomas Mann, Henrik Ibsen, Richard Wagner, Richard Strauss and many others prominent figures lived and worked there.
Der Blaue Reiter (The Blue Rider), a group of expressionist artists, was established in Munich in 1911.

In 1846 Munich's population was about 100,000, and by 1901 this had risen to about 500,000.

World War I and revolution
Following the outbreak of World War I in 1914, life in Munich became very difficult, as the Allied blockade of Germany led to food and fuel shortages. During French air raids in 1916 three bombs fell on Munich. 
After World War I, the city was at the center of much political unrest. In November 1918 on the eve of revolution, Ludwig III and his family fled the city. After the murder of the first republican premier of Bavaria Kurt Eisner in February 1919 by Anton Graf von Arco auf Valley, a member of the right-wing Thule Gesellschaft (Thule Society), the Bavarian Soviet Republic (Bayerische Räterepublik or Münchner Räterepublik) was proclaimed. After Communists had taken power, Lenin, who had lived in Munich some years before, sent a congratulatory telegram, but the Soviet Republic was put down on May 3, 1919 by the Freikorps.

On 3 May 1919, loyal elements of the German army (called the “White Guards of Capitalism” by the communists), with a force of 9,000, and Freikorps (such as the Freikorps Epp and the Marinebrigade Ehrhardt) with a force of about 30,000 men, entered Munich and defeated the communists after bitter street fighting in which over 1,000 supporters of the Munich "Soviet" government were killed. About 700 men and women were arrested and summarily executed by the victorious Freikorps troops.

After the Räterepublik had been brutally put down and the republican government had been restored, Munich subsequently became a hotbed of right-wing politics, among which Adolf Hitler and the Nazis rose to prominence.

Weimar Republic/Nazi regime and World War II

In 1923 Hitler and his supporters, who were concentrated in Munich, staged the Beer Hall Putsch, an attempt to overthrow the Weimar Republic and seize power. The revolt failed, resulting in Hitler's arrest and the temporary crippling of the Nazi Party, which was virtually unknown outside Munich. At the end of the Residenzstrasse, where the putsch resulted in the death of 16 Nazis and four policemen, the government of Bavaria placed a plaque after the war on the ground with the names of the four policemen who died there.

The city once again became a Nazi stronghold when the Nazis took power in Germany in 1933. The Nazis created the first concentration camp at Dachau, 10 miles northwest of the city. Because of its importance to the rise of Nazism, the Nazis called Munich the Hauptstadt der Bewegung ("Capital of the Movement"). The NSDAP headquarters were in Munich and many Führerbauten ("Führer-buildings") were built around the Königsplatz, some of which have survived to this day. During the Night of the Long Knives in 1934, Hitler eliminated potential political rivals. Ernst Röhm was killed in Munich's Stadelheim Prison.

In 1938, the Munich Agreement, Neville Chamberlain's famous act of appeasement to Hitler, was signed in the city by representatives of Germany, Italy, France and the Britain. It ceded the mostly German-speaking regions of Czechoslovakia, called the Sudetenland, to Germany. One year later Georg Elser failed in an attempt to assassinate Hitler during his annual speech to commemorate the Beer Hall Putsch in the Bürgerbräukeller in Munich. The Bürgerbräukeller is no longer there, but other beerhalls where Hitler spoke, like the Hofbräukeller, the famous Hofbräuhaus and the Löwenbräukeller are still there. One of the examples of Nazi architecture in München is the Haus der Deutschen Kunst, an art museum designed by architect Paul Ludwig Troost.

Munich was the base of the White Rose (German: Die Weiße Rose), a group of students that formed a resistance movement from June 1942 to February 1943. The core members were arrested and executed following a distribution of leaflets in Munich University by Hans and Sophie Scholl.

The city was very heavily damaged by Allied bombing during World War II—the city was hit by 71 air raids over a period of six years. As the bombings continued, more and more people moved out. By May 1945, 337,000 people (41%) had left.

The final battle for Munich began on 29 April 1945, when the US 20th Armored Division. US 3rd Infantry Division, US 42nd Infantry Division and US 45th Infantry Division assaulted through the outskirts of the city, also liberating Dachau concentration camp in the process. Some sectors were well defended against this opening push. However, the city itself was captured rather easily, as the German defenders there offered only light resistance, on 30 April 1945.

Postwar Munich

After American occupation in 1945, Munich was completely rebuilt following a meticulous and—by comparison to other war-ravaged German cities—rather conservative plan which preserved its pre-war street grid.

In 1957 Munich's population passed the one million mark. In 1958 Munich hosted the Chess Olympiad.

Munich was the site of the 1972 Summer Olympics, during which Israeli athletes were assassinated by Palestinian terrorists (see Munich massacre), when terrorist gunmen from the Palestinian "Black September" group took hostage members of the Israeli Olympic team. A rescue attempt by the West German government was unsuccessful and resulted in the deaths of the eleven Israeli hostages, five of the terrorists, and one German police officer.

Several games of the 1974 World Cup were also held in the city, including the German triumph against the Netherlands in a legendary final. Several games of the 2006 World Cup were also held in Munich.

In 1992 Munich's new airport was inaugurated and the inauguration of the Neue Messe, the new exhibition centre on the site of the former airport of Riem, took place in 1998.

The previous Roman Catholic Pope Benedict XVI (Joseph Ratzinger) was ordained a priest in the Archdiocese of Munich and Freising on June 29, 1951. Ratzinger served as  Archbishop of Munich from 1977 to 1982.

In December 2007 the German Olympic Committee unanimously agreed to support Munich's bid to host the 2018 Winter Olympics, however the bid failed.

See also
 Timeline of Munich
 History of the Jews in Munich

References

Further reading

 Hagen, Joshua. "Shaping Public Opinion through Architecture and Urban Design: Perspectives on Ludwig I and His Building Program for a “New Munich”." Central European History 48#1 (2015): 4-30.
 Jelavich, Peter. Munich and Theatrical Modernism: Politics, Playwriting, and Performance, 1890-1914 (1985)
 Jerram, Leif. Germanys other modernity: Munich and the making of metropolis, 1895-1930 (2014)
 Klahr, Douglas. "Munich as Kunststadt, 1900–1937: Art, Architecture, and Civic Identity." Oxford Art Journal 34#2 (2011): 179–201.
 Large, David Clay. Where Ghosts Walked: Munich's Road to the Third Reich (1997)
 Noehbauer, Hans F. Munich: City of the Arts (2007)
 Sternberg, Rolf, and Christine Tamásy. "Munich as Germany's no. 1 high technology region: empirical evidence, theoretical explanations and the role of small firm/large firm relationships." Regional Studies 33#4 (1999): 367–377.